Prof George Eason FRSE FIMA (1930–1999) was a British mathematician who was Professor of Mathematics at Strathclyde University 1970 to 1983. He did work on the dynamical theory of elasticity. He wrote papers relating to mathematical solutions of problems of human biology, including heat transfer through skin, the light-scattering effects of blood, and analysis of blood oxygenators.

Life
He was born in Chesterfield in England on 15 March 1930 the son of Henry Swindell Eason and Annie Shepherd Warchurst. He was raised in North Wingfield and educated at Clay Cross and in 1941 won a scholarship to attend Tupton Hall School. In 1948 he won a county scholarship, enabling him to study Mathematics and Physics at Birmingham University under Prof Rudolph Peierls, gaining a BSc in 1951 and MSc in 1952 (the latter technically being the first degree presented by Keele University). He received his doctorate (PhD) in 1954.
He first worked in the Royal Armament Research and Development Establishment in Kent as their Scientific Officer. In 1957 he began lecturing in Mathematics at Newcastle University under Prof Albert E. Green then in 1961 got the post of Senior Lecturer in Mathematics at Strathclyde University. In 1970 he gained the professorship and stayed there until retiral in 1983.

In 1975 he was elected a Fellow of the Royal Society of Edinburgh. His proposers were William D. Collins, Ian Sneddon, Norrie Everitt and Peter Ludwig Pauson.

In later life he retired to Aboyne and died there on 15 May 1999.

Family and Private Life

He married twice: first in 1958 to Olive Holdstock; secondly to Esme Burgess.
He had two daughters by his first marriage: Ann and Jill. The family then lived in Balfron.

He was a member of the Rotary Club of Strathendrick and served as their President for many year, being awarded the Paul Harris Fellowship for his services to the local community. He was also a keen marathon runner.

References

1930 births
1999 deaths
British mathematicians
Fellows of the Royal Society of Edinburgh
People from Chesterfield, Derbyshire
Alumni of the University of Birmingham
Academics of the University of Strathclyde
People from North Wingfield